Sphaerina is a genus of flies in the family Tachinidae.

Species
Sphaerina linearis (Townsend, 1915)
Sphaerina nigrifrons (Thompson, 1968)
Sphaerina nitens (Curran, 1934)
Sphaerina nitidula Wulp, 1890

References

Diptera of South America
Diptera of North America
Exoristinae
Tachinidae genera
Taxa named by Frederik Maurits van der Wulp